Hip hop music has been popular in Africa since the early 1980s due to widespread African American influence. In 1985, hip hop reached Senegal, a French-speaking country in West Africa. Some of the first Senegalese rappers were M.C. Lida, M.C. Solaar, and Positive Black Soul.

There also have been groups in Tanzania and other countries that emceed before 1989, that knows as Kwanza Unit although it is not very well known. During the late 1980s to mid 1990s, Stevano UGO, Lagos, Nigeria hit “Earthquaking African MC” became the first Afrobeat rap Artist playing on radio Ray Power FM released via Kennis Music founder, Kenny Ogungbe “African Diddy, this sparked more awareness of bilingual rappers started to escalate all over Africa. Each region had a new type of style of hip hop. Rap elements are also found in Kwaito, a new genre based on house music which developed in South Africa in the 1990s. Hip Hop the genre itself was created by African Americans during the early 1970s in The Bronx, New York. African Hip-hop and Rap has also women or girls like rapper. They begun Rap in 1980 in south Africa and west Africa.  Eno Barony of Ghana.

Algeria

Algerian hip-hop music, as a genre, includes the hip-hop music of both native Algerians and Algerians abroad. Algerians living abroad have contributed much to this genre, especially in France, where they are also considered part of the French hip hop scene. Some of these Algerians have become prominent. Algeria also has a hip-hop scene, which, while less well known internationally, is among the most developed in Africa and the Arab world.

Raï is a genre of music that developed in Algeria during the 1920s as rural migrants incorporated their native musical styles into the culture of the growing urban centers of western Algeria.

Angola
Angola has a lively hip hop music scene, including popular and influential crews like Conciencia da Africa, Atitude violenta, Pobres Sem Culpa, Filhos Da Ala Este, Guilhotina Verbal, Flagelo Urbano and Mc Mutu Moxy (Intelektu) Based in Cape Town, South Africa, and have begun to work with some South African hip hop musicians. Angolan hip hop is characterized by the influence of American hip hop beats with a special flavor of Portuguese flow, mixed with African rhythm and some Caribbean influence. SSP, Mutu Moxy (Intelektu) Political Rap, Kool Kleva, Nelboy Dastha Burda are credited for being the pioneers of the hip hop in Angola from the late 1980s to the early 1990s.

Hip-hop in Angola can be very censored. In order for artists to perform in large arenas where they can get a lot of exposure and recognition, their music has to be reviewed by a board. Because of this, oftentimes artists who tend to speak out on politics in their music have trouble blowing up. Instead of getting to perform at certain events such as festivals and actual concerts, they are forced to perform to small groups in underground areas. This has made the underground hip hop music scene in Angola very lively.

MCK is one of the most popular underground rappers in Angola. He is known for constantly getting in trouble with the law about his lyrics, in which he constantly criticizes and calls out the government. Other rappers in Angola known for this include Brigadeiro 10 Pacotes and Dioniso Casimiro.

Luanda is the music capital of Angola. Many new sounds have came from this city, including a popular one called Kuduro. Legends like DJ Amado and Buraka Som Systema helped to spread this sound quick internationally by performing across the globe.

Botswana
Botswana has never had a large popular music industry, with most of its recorded music coming from South Africa or further abroad. However, since about 1999, Botswana hip hop performers have begun to gain mainstream acceptance; the record labels such as Dagee Records,

Phat Boy etc. has done a lot to promote Botswana hip hop. The hip hop movement in Botswana has grown over the years as evidenced by the release over the years of albums and songs from artists such as Mr Doe, Zeus, Touch Motswak Tswak, Ignition, S.C.A.R, Awesomore.aka Gaddamit, Cashless Society, Nitro, Konkrete, HT, Flex, Dice, Dj Dagizus, 3rd Mind, Kast, Nomadic, and Draztik to name a few. The release of hip hop albums is slow because of the small market and competition from other genres of mostly dance-oriented music. Since 2000 hip hop has achieved more prominence in Botswana, with rappers like Scar Kast and Third Mind releasing relatively successful albums. In 2006, Scar released his sophomore offering, "Happy Hour". The same year Kast released "Dazzit". S.C.A.R has since won a Channel O Spirit of Africa Award 2007 for best hip hop. New Hip Hop Musicians such as William Last KRM, Ban T, DoubleUp(Ambitiouz Entertainment) and AbtheActivist have found mainstream success in the neighboring South Africa .

Cameroon
After hip hop reached Cameroon, it took two years to actually become popular. This was because when the genre of music first reached the country, it was associated with angry youth and rebellious behavior.

The hip hop scene of Cameroon includes pioneers like Manhitoo and Negrissim' who broke new ground in the early 1990s. Other hip hop artists from Cameroon are Les Nubians. Stanley Enow and Jovi continue to build the industry.

Krotal, also known as Paul Edouard Etoundi Onambele, is one of the most legendary pioneer rappers to come out of Cameroon. He also founded the popular record label Ndabott Prod in 2007. The label has worked and continues to work with artists such as Abaracadabra, JaHel MineliH, Cyrille Nkono. Krotal himself also works under the label. Evindi and Sundjah formed one of the most influential rap groups out of Cameroon, Evindi and Sundjah in 1995.

Rap in Cameroon has continued to evolve since then. For example, Cameroon was not used to sampling beats. Jovi, who also goes by Ndukong Godlove, was one of the first artist to do this in the country and make it popular. Now many artists in Cameroon follow in his footsteps. Today the most viewed song and video out of Cameroon is Stanley Enow's ‘Hein Pere’, which was released in 2013. Rap in Cameroon is also no longer associated with angry youth.

Côte d'Ivoire

Ivorian hip hop became a mainstream part of the popular music of Côte d'Ivoire beginning in 2009 after the victory of Ivorian hip hop group Kiff No Beat at the hip-hop contest Faya Flow, and has been fused with many of the country's native styles, such as zouglou. There is a kind of gangsta rap-influenced Ivorian hip hop called rap dogba. Ivorian Hip Hop is mostly in the French language, but includes nouchi (Ivorian Slang).

Democratic Republic of Congo
Hip hop in Democratic Republic of Congo is mainly used as a way for people, mainly youth, to express their political views and hold the government accountable. Since the civil war in Congo there has been an increase in random senseless killings, rape, and crime in general.  Hip hop has been a very popular way to protest these crimes going on in the country. As citizens' freedom of speech dwindles away. Rap and its lyrics have been used by the youth as a way to protest this and rebel. Fally Ipupa is one of Congos most popular rappers.

The capital of the Democratic Republic of the Congo, Kinshasa, has long been a major home for pan-African styles of popular music like rumba, soukous and kwassa kwassa. Long-time performers on the Kinshasa scene include Profetzion (formerly of Holokaust), and the Congo Brazzaville rapper Passi.

Gambia

Gambia's much larger neighbor, Senegal, is home to a thriving hip hop scene, which has exerted a strong influence on Gambian hip hop but Gambian hip hop is now evolving its own unique style. In 1999, the Gambia Radio & Television Services gave out the first Gambian Rap Award. The first crew to win the award for best new act was Da Fugitvz, who rapped in Wolof, the national language of Senegal, and thus became popular in both countries. They also later played at Popkomm in Germany.

Ghana

Hip hop in Ghana is commonly referred to as Gh hiphop. The phrase GH Rap was created by Jayso and Ball J when they released their first Skillions mixtape. According to the two rappers, GH Rap means Hiphop made in Ghana. Hiplife is also a Ghanaian genre similar to hip hop music; it is a combination of hip hop music and highlife. This started in the late 1980s and early 90s with the hiplife father Reggie Rockstone, VIP, Talking Drums and Nananom. But others did a mix of English with Twi or Ga like Heaven n' Hell, this was copied by secondary school and small area rap groups who will rap in pidgin English (a mix of English and other dialects). The Ghanaian music scene has also produced a number of rappers and DJs who are both locally and internationally renowned. Ghanaian rapping is mostly in the English language, but is also sometimes in Twi, Ewe, Ga or Hausa.

Guinea
Although Guinea is not much known internationally for any variety of popular music, there is a local hip hop music scene, which has produced one crew with an international reputation, Kill Point, which has toured across West Africa. Many groups use Guinean folk rhythms and styles in their music. The Guinean Africa Rap Festival is held in Conakry.

Hip Hop in Guinea first appeared in the 1990s. Since then, it has been used in the country to fight political and social battles, and in the fight for civil rights and justice. It is constantly being used to criticize the government. Rap in Guinea often features references to Congos history and historical figures. It has entirely changed the sociocultural identity of Guinea's youth, which are now more concerned with making political changes in the country.

Most rappers in Guinea are also activists. Masta Tito is one of the most popular rappers out of Guinea. He is symbolic of the rapper-activist combo in Guinea. Other rapper-activists in Guinea include Cientista Realistas, As One, F. B. M. J., Bunca MC, Rock Salim, Dame Cotche, Race Preto, Fil Cap, Best Friends, Daw Tchaw, Baloberos, Torres Gemeo.

Kenya

Madagascar
Hip hop has rapidly grown in popularity in Madagascar in the past decade. The local name of hip hop is "Haintso Haintso", meaning "H. H." (for hip hop). Malagasy hip hop, although largely reflective of Western genre standards, has been moving toward incorporation of more Malagasy musical tradition in its style and instrumentation.

Hip hop spread to Madagascar in about 1985 together with breakdancing. The local rap scene (Rap Gasy) remained underground until the late nineties, although artists as early as 1994 were attracting attention with their politically provocative lyrics.

On 21 June 2007, UNICEF chose a 15-year-old Malagasy rap star, Name Six as its first-ever Junior Goodwill Ambassador for Eastern and Southern Africa. The young rapper's work continues the genre's tradition of social critique and political commentary, focusing largely on the challenges faced by children in underprivileged communities in Madagascar and voicing the views and concerns of the young, who are routinely omitted from political decision-making processes.

Malawi

Hip hop culture in Malawi is relatively young. Notable rappers who were early on the scene include Criminal A, Bantu Clan, Real Elements, Dynamike, Dominant 1, Knight of the Round Table, and Wisdom Chitedze. The scene started to gain traction in the late 90s and expanded further in the early 2000s when cheap computers and recording gear became widely available to artists. The launch of Television Malawi in 1999 provided a platform for rappers to have their music videos beamed to a national audience. The music video to Wisdom Chitedze's song Tipewe was on regular rotation on the station in its early days. In the early to mid-2000s artists such as Nospa G, M Krazy, David Kalilani, and Gosple helped push the music further. A lot of Malawi's early hip hop music contained social commentary, religious, and introspective themes.

By the late 2000s the scene had picked up further with artists such as Barry One, Basement, Mandela Mwanza, Hyphen, Fredokiss, and Tay Grin gaining notoriety. Tay Grin's music video for the song Stand Up was featured considerably on Channel O. He was not the first Malawian rapper to get his song on that station; that accolade goes to the Real Elements. However, Tay Grin's got much more airplay. In 2009, Phyzix released his debut studio album The Lone Ranger LP which contained the hit singles Cholapitsa and Gamba. Around the same time, Christian rap started to gain popularity and that movement was spearheaded by Manyanda Nyasulu, DJ Kali, KBG, Double Zee, Liwu, C-Scripture, Asodzi, Erasto, and Sintha.

Some of the producers who helped pioneer the sound of Malawian hip hop include Dominant 1, Maj Beats, The Dare Devils, Kond1, Dynamike, Keith Justus Wako, Qabaniso Malewezi, Tapps, Dizzo, Sonye, Kas Mdoka and Rebel Musiq.

DJs such as Dr Gwynz and Kenny Klips also helped push the music on radio. They hosted a show called The Hip Hop Drill  which involved playing rap music and a phone-in rap competition whereby rappers called in and competed to spit the best bars.

Morocco

Namibia
Hip hop music and culture have a big influence on the Namibian youth, with American [rappers], [Tupac Shakur], and [The Notorious B.I.G.] being popular. Most of the urban Namibian youth have adopted a hip-hop lifestyle, including their dress code. Early [Namibian hip hop] acts include a group called Dungeon Family.

Niger

"Rap Nigerien", a style of Nigerien hip hop, began to develop in the late 1990s, mostly in Niamey, and has become one of the dominant popular music forms in Niger. It is a mélange of different languages spoken in Niger. Sampled music is often mellow, and is mixed with the traditional music, although more aggressive dance styles have been mixed in, reflecting influences of French, American, and other West African hip hop styles (especially Ivorian hip hop). Young, dissatisfied Nigeriens have used the form to talk about common social problems. Local recordings are mostly sold on cassette tapes and compact discs, as with most forms of contemporary West African popular music.

Hip hop groups began to appear and perform in Niamey in 1998. In August 2004, UNICEF opened its "Scene Ouverte Rap", where 45 new groups entered selections among an informal count of 300 existing groups. Shows took place at Niamey's Jean Rouch Centre Culturel Franco – Nigerien (CCFN) in August 2004.

Nigeria
Nigeria is sometimes called Naija.
Afro Hip hop in Nigeria dates back to the late eighties and early nineties. The first place hip hop gained popularity in Nigeria was in Lagos, Nigeria. During this time (1980s), Nigeria was under a military governorship. This period of military governorship brought about crisis in Nigeria which involved the devaluation of currency, loss of jobs and persistent unemployment especially for new graduates from the University. Hip hop during this time was used as a means of escape by youths from the country's crisis. It was made popular by using Nigerian languages in the lyrics along with traditional hip hop beats, such as those made by the founding fathers of hip hop, DJ Kool Herc, Afrika Bambata and Grandmaster Flash. Since there were very few record labels to sign a new musician at this time, the youths decided to start making music on their own with a very little budget. The music videos were very simple and not grand and expensive. The availability of computers and cheap music editing software in the late 1990s and the first decade of the 21st century enabled Nigerian musicians to achieve higher quality recordings which quickly won over the Nigerian audience. This was a very cheap way to make music and a new Nigerian hip hop musician would make music and sell it on a CD. This was one way for the youths to be independent from the government by being lucrative and creating jobs for themselves, since the government was not helping them. Hip hop was used during this time for entertainment, but also to criticize the government and demand change. Groups and solo artists during that period include the likes of Junior & Pretty, Daniel 'Danny' Wilson, Plantashun Boiz, Remedies with members Eedris Abdulkareem, Eddy Remedy & Tony Tetuila. The late 90s and the early years of the new millennium saw an outburst of artists and groups, many returning home from the Western Diaspora, like eLDee da Don of Trybesmen, U.G.O, Madarocka and the S.O.U.R.C.E. Intl Clique, Naeto C of W.F.A, and from Europe, JJC and the 419 squad became a part of mainstream Nigerian music after the collapse of pop trends like Yo-pop. These up-rising artists in Nigeria began to localize hip hop and make songs in English and any other Nigerian language as a means of self-expression, thus making Nigerian hip hop multilingual. Just as Nigeria's Nollywood movies have done with Western movies, Nigerian hip hop has begun to displace Western popular music. Musicians such as Eedris Abdulkareem started making multilingual hip hop music and the lyrics were usually in English, Pidgin English and another Nigerian language such as Yoruba, Igbo, and Hausa.

Hip-Hop World Magazine, based in Nigeria, is a prominent publication that has helped fashion the orientation of hip hop culture in Nigeria and across the continent. African Beatz, Blast and Bubbles magazines are other similar major Nigerian hip hop publications.

Rwanda

Hip hop spread to Rwanda in the early to mid-1980s. The most prominent figure in the early Rwandan scene was DJ Berry (Nsabimana Abdul Aziz), who was a DJ for Kigali Night and Cosmos and a presenter for Radio Rwanda, in addition to being an early rapper and breakdancer. The Rwandan government of the period did not approve of hip hop, however, and DJ Berry was forced into exile in Goma, Zaire, where he continued performing. He later moved on to Germany and recorded "Hey You", which became a hit on both Rwandan and Ugandan radio. After returning to Africa in 1990, Berry continued to promote hip hop in Rwanda until his death from AIDS in 1996. By the mid-1990s, hip hop was growing increasingly popular in Rwanda, due to the introduction of 101 FM Kigali and TVR in 1995, and American and French rappers like Tupac Shakur and MC Solaar became popular.

The first locally recorded Rwandan hip hop hit was "Peaced Up" by KP Robinson ft Mc Monday Assoumani. This was promoted by DJ Alex of Radio Rwanda from 1997.

Senegal

Senegal has one of the most active hip hop scenes on the continent, and has produced international stars like MC Solaar. US hip hop became popular in Senegal in the early 1980s, and a few MCs began rapping. During this period, many Senegalese rappers were copying American performers quite closely. One often-cited reason for the prominence of Senegalese hip hop is the ancient musical and oral traditions of that country, which include some practices, like griots and tassou, which are similar to rapping.

It was not until later in the decade that a more distinctive Senegalese sound began evolving, along with the use of Wolof lyrics. The 1990s saw a division in the Senegalese scene, with some artists remaining underground, associated with the American alternative hip hop scene, while others, like Black Mboolo ("Alal"), fused hip hop with Senegalese mbalax style, (this is called "mbalax rap" or "rap ragga soul"), which uses the sabar drums.

Sierra Leone
Sierra Leone rap music was originated by a Sierra Leone–based rapper; YOK Seven in the late 1990s. Prior to this time pop rapper Jimmy B had already blown up in South Africa. His pop rap was a rave in Sierra Leone during the mid 1990s. Hip hop music in Sierra Leone includes Grammy-nominated artist and author Freddy Will.

Somalia

One of the most internationally renowned Somali rappers is Canada-based K'naan (real name Kanaan Warsame). The award-winning artist is a rapper and a poet with three albums, The Dusty Foot Philosopher (on BMG Music), The Dusty Foot on the Road (on Wrasse Records) and Troubadour (on A&M/OctoScope Music) He has been one of the most popular artists in this country and across the continent this century and is very politically engaged. As a teenager, K’Naan began to write songs to help him process the turmoil he experienced in Mogadishu. He had a major influence on rap when he released The Dusty Foot Philosopher. In this song he combined African instruments with American hip-hop to form a new sound. Many artists have followed in his footsteps. Soobax is one of his most popular tracks.

South Africa
Although the history of South African hip hop in Cape Town can be tracked back to the early 1980s, cultural exchange between the United States, the West Indies, and South Africa was widespread since the 19th century. South African artists were influenced by minstrelsy and swing to bebop and beyond, which was partly in response to British imperialism. The political history of Africa plays a predominant role in South African music. In the late 19th century gold was discovered in Johannesburg, and people from different tribes began to migrate to the Johannesburg area. As a result of the rich diversity of various South African tribes, traditional music of South Africa mixed with European music led to the development of a different sound. 
The musical and social movement of hip hop in South Africa has grown exponentially in the last two decades, most notoriously in the form of home-grown Kwaito, which is actually a distinct musical genre in itself.

Much of hip hop and Kwaito in South Africa is derived from western beats and tunes mixed with localized rhythms and accents.

Lyrically, South African hip hop is largely reliant on the political landscape from which the country has only recently emerged. If the explicit mention of Apartheid is not offered, lyrics will often revolve around the residue of the political system; such as the prevalence of HIV and AIDS, violence in the major cities, and what it means to be South African.

On the other hand, Kwaito has been seen as more devoted to "positive imagery", taking listeners away from the harsher realities of township life, where it originated. Currently, South African hip hop is beginning to diverge and acquire its own musical style, as individual provinces are developing their own styles of hip hop.

As much as hip hop has grown in South Africa it is still in its infancy in terms of recognition and artists rarely sell well. Differences in styles and approaches to the art have led to the South African market being split into sectors, for example: Cape Town has long been termed South African hip hop's birth ground with its more politically charged and socially conscious artists.

There is also a large number of Women in hip-hop in South Africa. South Africa has a significant number of women active in the mainstream hip-hop scene, more than many other countries in the region.

Tracing its origins in South Africa, the youth embraced hip hop and its culture from the United States including its break dancing and graffiti aspects. These styles of expression were the predecessors to involvement in the music, due to the high cost and difficulty in finding music. Economic and political sanctions made finding American music extremely difficult. U.S. hip hop albums were seldom imported, but rather sent by relatives outside the country. The audience was not totally approving however. Many were not happy with the links US hip hop had to the "structures that were largely responsible for the devastating conditions in the Third World countries." The young people took hip hop and its anger, passion, and style in order to express themselves. They localized the music to express culture, frustration, and hope in order to tell their own stories. The older population used that anger and passion to pass messages against the occurring apartheid, and also to connect with the youth. The music was perfect for the time because it was able to take the language of the underprivileged, parade it, and make it attractive to the point where people took pride in their style of music.

Tanzania

Togo

Uganda
Uganda's hip hop scene began in the early to mid-1990s, especially among university students at Makerere University and elsewhere. The Bataka Squad, formed in the early 1990s are the originators of the Lugaflow style, using the native Luganda language. Other formative groups on the Ugandan hip hop scene in the early 90s include Young Vibrations, MC Afrik, DJ Berry, Sylvester and Abramz and Kaddo. Club Pulsations in Kampala was a hotspot for Ugandan hip hop in the 90s. In 2002, Klear Kut were nominated for the Kora All Africa Music Awards in the "Most Promising African Group" and "Revelation of the Year" categories.

In 2003 Geoffrey Ekongot, Saba Saba aka Krazy Native, of the Bataka Squad, Francis Agaba, the late Paul Mwandha of Musicuganda.com, and Xenson formed the Uganda Hip Hop Foundation. In 2003, the Foundation hosted the first Ugandan Hip Hop Summit and concert at Club Sabrina's in Kampala. It was so successful that they have hosted it every year for the past four years. In 2005 the Bavubuka All Starz was formed under the leadership of Silas aka Babaluku of the Bataka Squad, with the mission of bringing hip hop music and community together to address social causes. Keko is currently one of the most promising and talented rappers in Uganda. Of late Uganda has produced globally recognized MCs like Bana Mutibwa whose commonly known as Burney MC. In 2013 he represented Uganda at the biggest hip hop festival in Europe (Hip Hop Kemp).

Lumix Da Don, a.k.a. Lumumba Patrick was an underground Ugandan rapper, record producer and CEO of Valley Curve Records. He made hip hop the biggest genre in Northern Uganda.

Kiga flow is performed in Rukiga and Runyankole.

Zambia
Hip hop in Zambia has its roots in the late '80s and early '90s; many young people were influenced by American hip hop mostly shown on imported programs by the local broadcaster Zambia National Broadcasting Corporation. Early rappers and crews include Blaaze and Chilu Lemba.

Daddy Zemus was one of the first artists who fused ragga and hip hop and is widely revered as the first artist to proudly use local languages to present his craft in this art form.

The first hip hop album to be released in Zambia was actually a gospel hip hop album called Talk About God by a duo called MT God Bless which was released on cassette tape in 2003. (Mandiva Syananzu & Tommy Banda were the two rappers). It got massive airplay both locally and internationally. MT God Bless were also the first Christian hip hop dual to have their music video played on South Africa's Channel O. Pictures of the cassette tape can be seen on Mandiva's Facebook page with the year 2003 inscribed on it. In 2005 C.R.I$..I$. Mr Swagger released what is considered the biggest debut release by a hip hop artist in Zambia titled "Officer in Charge". Other notable artists to come up over the years are Black Muntu, The Holstar, Conscious, Takondwa, Pitch Black, Diamond Chain, 5ive 4our, Zone Fam, C.Q Krytic, Slap Dee, Macky 2, Mic Diggy and Urban Chaos

In 2007 The Hip Hop Foundation of Zambia was formed, as a registered arts and culture organization. The organization was formed and registered under the Zambia Association of Musicians as a group member. ZAM is registered under the Zambian National Arts Council.

Zambian rappers Slap Dee and Macky 2 are widely considered the most popular vernacular Hip Hop artists in Zambia. Zone Fam formed in 2007 and gained popularity in 2011 when they released their debut album single "Shaka Zulu On Em". In November 2013 they released "Contolola" which gained the number one position on the Afribizcharts.

Zimbabwe
Zimbabwe hip hop music has been a big hit to the young people of Zimbabwe, through the rise of amazing artists like the late Calvin who sang with South African rapper Cassper Nyovest and the  Changamire Hip Hop award winner  Holy Ten who collaborated the Nasty C from South Africa. Bulawayo born rappers like POY and Naborth Rizzla played a big role in the growth of rap music in Zimbabwe through running tours around colleges and Universities. Victoria Falls City also has a huge hip hop movement with big promoters like Mordcai Ngazah and Brighton Musaidzi creating amazing platforms like their Victoria Falls News weekly newspaper and  Umclulo an African Hip Hop Magazine and strictly hip hop radio station.

Hip Hop and Civil Rights in Africa 
Rap has been used as a form of political protest in Africa since it reached the continent. Fela Kuti is legendary in Africa for being one of the first artists to use rap to critique the government. Since then, a large majority of rappers in Africa have followed in his footsteps. Rappers in Africa are often responsible for political change. For example, Keur Gui, a popular rap group in Africa helped to lead the Y'en a Marre movement in Senegal. They played a large role in getting thousands of Senegalese citizens to vote and make sure President Wade did not serve a third term.

Because hip hop in Africa has such a large impact on politics, many countries have begun censorship of rap. However, banned artists often gain popularity as listening to them is seen as a form of protest and rebellion.

Rapper PilAto for example, was arrested for participating in protests when he accused future member of the ruling party in Zambia of stealing state resources in 2017, in one of his songs.

Recordings
Bongo Flava. Swahili Rap from Tanzania (2004) compilation by Out Here Records
Lagos Stori plenti – urban sounds from Nigeria (2006) compilation by Out Here Records
African Rebel Music – Roots Reggae & Dancehall (2006) compilation by Out Here Records
Urban Africa Club – hip hop, Kwaito and Dancehall (2007) compilation by Out Here Records

References

External links
Africanhiphop Dot Com – The Foundation of African Hip Hop Culture Online (11 years online)